Baptist Girl College, often abbreviated as BGC, is an all-girls secondary school at Idi Aba neighbourhood of Abeokuta, Ogun State, Nigeria. The school was founded about 100 years ago. BGC was among the mission schools taken over by the military government after the civil war in the 1970s.

Notable alumni
Wuraola Esan

Photo Gallery of Baptist Girls College

References

Schools in Abeokuta
Secondary schools in Ogun State
Baptist schools in Nigeria
Girls' schools in Nigeria